Meech Lake is located within Gatineau Park in the Municipality of Chelsea, Quebec, Canada. It is located about 20 km northwest of Gatineau. The lake was named after Reverend Asa Meech, an early settler in the area.

Near the lake, on Meech Creek, are the ruins of a fertilizer plant built by Thomas "Carbide" Willson during the 1900s. In 1981, Willson's former summer home (the Willson House) on Meech Lake was converted into a government conference centre. The house is notable for its use, in 1987, as the site of meetings on the Meech Lake Accord (which proposed the overhauling of Canada's constitution) between the provincial premiers and then-Prime Minister Brian Mulroney.

The lake is a multi-use area with picnicking,  beach goers, boats,  paddle boards, and historic cottages dating to before the park was formed.  It is a popular lake for people who like to train in open water swimming.  It is also the site of the annual Meech Lake Triathlon.

In 1988, a study conducted for the NCC confirmed that Meech Lake residents are responsible for most of the human-produced phosphorus flowing into the lake, i.e., 66%, whereas visitors only account for 26%. Phosphorus, in excessive amounts is responsible for the proliferation of blue-green algae, a problem that has afflicted the lake in recent years.

The National Capital Commission (NCC), steward of Gatineau Park, operates beaches on the lake during the summer. Although it is not condoned by the NCC, there is a secluded beach often used by naturists. Lack of clear signage on the lake that fires are prohibited as well as enforcement is one problem of this highly used area.  For example, in the summer of 2016 a fire on one island caused by a picnicker resulted in 25% of the island burning.

References

Lakes of Outaouais
National Capital Region (Canada)
Nude beaches